Jogi is an Indo-Aryan language spoken by at least some of the caste of Jogis of India and Pakistan. The language is generally considered a dialect of Marwari, but the pronouns are distinct. Many Hindu as well as Muslim Jogi's of Sindh speak Jogi language as their native including Sindhi as well; whereas Jogi in other parts of Pakistan speak mostly Jogi language. However, the Jogi living in Thari Mirwah Sindh are a sub-caste of the Rajpar tribe, whose native language is Sindhi, and do not speak Jogi.

References

Languages of Sindh
Articles citing ISO change requests